Portrait of a Mobster is a 1961 American crime film directed by Joseph Pevney and starring Vic Morrow, Leslie Parrish and Ray Danton repeating his role as 'Legs' Diamond.

Plot
Up-and-coming racketeer Dutch Schultz  joins the Legs Diamond gang in Prohibition-era New York. A bootlegger named Murphy is murdered by Dutch, who falls for the dead man's daughter, Iris.

Iris marries her fiancé, Frank Brennan, a police detective. They need money and Frank accepts payoffs from Dutch, who is forming a gang of his own.

After getting rid of Legs, Mad Dog Coll and others standing in his way, Dutch again makes a play for Iris, but she learns that he killed her father and begins to drink. Frank vows to reform and win her back. Betraying his pal Bo to the mob, Dutch discovers that a hit has been put out on himself as well. While fighting for his life, he is shot by Bo by mistake and is killed.

Score
Howard Jackson compiled the score from White Heat and four other Max Steiner scores.

Cast

Vic Morrow as Dutch Schultz
Leslie Parrish as Iris Murphy
Peter Breck as Frank Brennan
Norman Alden as Bo Wetzel
Robert McQueeney as Michael Ferris
 Ken Lynch as 	Lieutenant D. Corbin
 Stephen Roberts as 	Guthrie
 Joseph Gallison as 	Vincent Coll
Frank DeKova as Anthony Parazzo  
Ray Danton  as  "Legs" Diamond  
Joseph Gallison as "Mad Dog" Coll
 Larry J. Blake as John Murphy
 Harry Holcombe as Capt. Bayridge
 Frances Morris as 	Louise Murphy
 Gil Perkins as Joe Murdoch
 Jon Kowal asLou Rhodes 
 Arthur Tenen as 	Steve Matryck
 Eddie Hanley as 	Matty Krause
 Joe Turkel as Joe Noe
Anthony Eisley as  Legal Advisor
Poncie Ponce as Master of Ceremonies

References

External links

1961 films
Films directed by Joseph Pevney
Warner Bros. films
American black-and-white films
Films set in the 1920s
Films set in New York City
Films about Jewish-American organized crime
Crime films based on actual events
1961 crime drama films
Films about the Irish Mob
Cultural depictions of Dutch Schultz
Cultural depictions of Legs Diamond
Cultural depictions of Mad Dog Coll
1960s English-language films